Henrietta Cordelia Ray (August 30, 1852 – January 5, 1916) was an African-American poet and teacher. Her parents were notable abolitionists, and had worked for the Underground Railroad in Manhattan.

Biography
Cordelia Ray was born in New York City, to parents Charlotte Augusta Burroughs and Charles B. Ray. She was named for her father's first wife, Henrietta Ray. She had six siblings including two sisters, Charlotte and Florence.

In 1891, Cordelia graduated from the University of the City of New York with a master's in pedagogy. She also studied French, German, Greek and Latin at the Saveneur School of Languages. She became a schoolteacher, but stopped teaching in order to write.

Ray's ode "Lincoln" was read at the unveiling of the Emancipation Memorial in Washington, D.C. in April 1876. A memoir of her father, written with her sister Florence, was published by J.J. Little & Co. in 1887. Her collection Sonnets was printed, also by Little, in 1893, and her Poems came out in 1910.

Ray died on January 5, 1916.

Sonnets

Ray's Sonnets (1893) was a short book of 12 sonnets on Milton, Shakespeare, Raphael, and Beethoven, among other subjects. Her sonnet on the Haitian revolutionary Toussaint L'Overture is notable for its belated engagement in black politics (absent from her earlier verse) and for its allusions to William Wordsworth's famous sonnet "To Touissaint L'Overture":

To those fair isles where crimson sunsets burn,We send a backward glance to gaze on thee,Brave Toussaint! thou was surely born to beA hero; thy proud spirit could but spurnEach outrage on the race. Couldst thou unlearnThe lessons taught by instinct? Nay! and weWho share the zeal that would make all men free,Must e’en with pride unto thy life-work turn.Soul-dignity was thine and purest aim;And ah! how sad that thou wast left to mournIn chains ’neath alien skies. On him, shame! shame!That mighty conqueror who dared to claimThe right to bind thee. Him we heap with scorn,And noble patriot! guard with love thy name.

Ray's reputation as a poet rests primarily on her early poem to Abraham Lincoln and on sonnets from her 1910 volume, which were republished widely in anthologies in the early twentieth century. Her work has been rediscovered in twenty-first-century scholarship.

Publications
 Sketch of the life of Rev. Charles B. Ray. New York: Press of J.J. Little & Co., 1887
 Sonnets. New York: Press of J.J. Little & Co., 1893
 Poems. New York: Grafton Press, 1910

References

External links
 Cordelia Ray at Digital Schomburg African American Women Writers of the 19th Century.
 

1852 births
1916 deaths
African-American poets
African-American schoolteachers
Schoolteachers from New York (state)
American women educators
African-American activists
Educators from New York City
New York University alumni
American biographers
American women poets
19th-century American poets
19th-century American women writers
Activists from New York City
American women biographers
Historians from New York (state)
20th-century African-American women writers
20th-century American women writers
20th-century African-American writers